This is a comprehensive list of awards, honours and other recognitions bestowed on Julius Nyerere.

Nyerere was a Tanzanian anti-colonial activist, politician, and political theorist. He governed Tanganyika as prime minister from 1961 to 1962 and then as president from 1962 to 1964, after which he led its successor state, Tanzania, as president from 1964 to 1985. He was a founding member and chair of the Tanganyika African National Union (TANU) party, and of its successor Chama Cha Mapinduzi, from 1954 to 1990. Ideologically an African nationalist and African socialist, he was a controversial figure. Across Africa he gained widespread respect as an anti-colonialist and in power received praise for ensuring that, unlike many of its neighbours, Tanzania remained stable and unified in the decades following independence. 

He is held in deep respect within Tanzania, where he is often referred to by the Swahili honorific Mwalimu ("teacher") and described as the "Father of the Nation."

Honours

Foreign Honours

Domestic Honours

Scholastic

Honorary academic awards

Awards 

 1973, Jawaharlal Nehru Award, Nehru Award for International Understanding, India.
 1982, Third World Prize, India
 1983, Nansen Refugee Award, UNHCR
 1988, Joliot-Curie gold medal, World Peace Council.
 1992, International Simón Bolívar Prize, UNESCO.
 1994, TANAPA / Gold Medal of Outstanding on Wildlife and Environmental Conservation, Tanzania.
 1995, Gandhi Peace Prize, India. 
 1997, Nnandi Azikiwe Award, Nigeria.
 2000, Statesman of the Century, CCM, Tanzania.

References

External links